Mindstorm or Mindstorms may refer to:
 Mindstorm (film), a science-fiction telefilm
 Lego Mindstorms, a series of programmable robotics kits
MinDStorm, a 2006 educational video game
 Mindstorm Studios, a computer video game developer and software developer company
 Mindstorms (book), 1980 book by Seymour Papert
 "Mind Storm", a song by Joe Satriani on his album Strange Beautiful Music